Clint Allen Daniels (born August 24, 1974 in Panama City, Florida) is an American country music artist. Signed to Arista Nashville in 1998, Daniels charted two singles for the label. In 2003, Daniels signed to Epic Records, releasing a third single but no album. Although he has not recorded since 2003, he has co-written Number One singles for Joe Nichols and Montgomery Gentry, as well as a Top 20 hit for Brooks & Dunn.

Biography
Clint Daniels was born August 24, 1974 in Panama City, Florida, but raised in the Panama City suburb of Lynn Haven. Daniels first gained an interest in music as a child, singing with his sister in church. Inspired by bluegrass music, Daniels taught himself to play guitar at age twelve. After graduating high school, he moved to Nashville, Tennessee in pursuit of a career in country music. By 1998, he was discovered by an A&R staff member from the Arista Nashville label, and was signed to the label that year.

He charted two singles, "A Fool's Progress" and "When I Grow Up," which respectively reached No. 44 and No. 53 on the country singles charts. Both were to have been included on a self-titled debut album, which was ultimately not released due to Arista's restructuring. Daniels moved to Epic Records in 2003. Although he released a third single, the No. 56 "The Letter (Almost Home)," he never released an album for Epic and has not recorded since.

Daniels has also co-written songs for other country artists, including the Number One hits "Brokenheartsville" by Joe Nichols and "Roll with Me" by Montgomery Gentry (from 2003 and 2008 respectively), as well as Brooks & Dunn's 2008 single "God Must Be Busy". He also co-wrote two songs that were released in late 2010: Clay Walker's "Where Do I Go from You" and Easton Corbin's "I Can't Love You Back". In late 2013, he co-wrote Josh Thompson's "Cold Beer with Your Name on It". In late 2017, he co-wrote Jon Pardi's "She Ain't in It". In early 2019, he co-wrote Eric Church's "Some of It".

Discography

Singles

Music videos

References

1974 births
Living people
People from Panama City, Florida
American country singer-songwriters
Country musicians from Florida
Arista Nashville artists
Epic Records artists
Singer-songwriters from Florida
People from Bay County, Florida
21st-century American singers